De Goede is a Dutch surname, meaning "the good". People with the surname include:

Aar de Goede (1928–2016), Dutch politician, State Secretary of Finance 1973-77
Eva de Goede (born 1989), Dutch field hockey player
Jules de Goede (1937–2007), Dutch abstract artist in Australia and England
Suzanne de Goede (born 1984), Dutch racing cyclist

The term was also used as a description of a number of medieval rulers, including:
Karel de Goede (ca.1080–1127), Count of Flanders
Willem de Goede (1287–1337), Count of Holland and Zeeland
Filips de Goede (1396–1467), as Duke of Burgundy ruler of much of the Low Countries

References

Dutch-language surnames